The 2018 Maine State Senate elections took place as part of the biennial United States elections. Maine voters elected state senators in all 35 of the state senate's districts. State senators serve two-year terms in the State Senate.

A primary election on June 12, 2018 determined which candidates appear on the November 6 general election ballot. Primary election results can be obtained from the Maine Secretary of State's website.

Following the 2016 state Senate elections, Republicans maintained effective control of the House with 18 members.

The Maine Secretary of State provides both a detailed description of each Senate seat as well as maps for each district, including this statewide Senate map showing all 35 Senate districts.

After the 2018 elections, Republicans lost control of the chamber. The Democrats needed to net one Senate seat. In the election, the Democrats gained four seats, claiming the majority.

Summary of Results by State Senate District

Close Races
Seats where the margin of victory was under 10%:

Detailed Results by Maine State Senate District

District 1

District 2

District 3

District 4

District 5

District 6

District 7

District 8

District 9

District 10

District 11

District 12

District 13

District 14

District 15

District 16

District 17

District 18

District 19

District 20

District 21

District 22

District 23

District 24

District 25

District 26

District 27

District 28

District 29

District 30

District 31

District 32

District 33

District 34

District 35

See also
United States elections, 2018
United States Senate election in Maine, 2018
United States House of Representatives elections in Maine, 2018
Maine gubernatorial election, 2018
Maine House of Representatives election, 2018
Maine Question 1, June 2018

References

State Senate
Maine Senate elections
Maine State Senate